The 1986 Southwest Conference men's basketball tournament was held March 7–9, 1986, at Reunion Arena in Dallas, Texas. 

Number 5 seed Texas Tech defeated 2 seed  67-63 to win their 3rd championship and receive the conference's automatic bid to the 1986 NCAA tournament.

Format and seeding 
The tournament consisted of the top 8 teams playing in a single-elimination tournament.

Tournament

References 

1985–86 Southwest Conference men's basketball season
Basketball in the Dallas–Fort Worth metroplex
Southwest Conference men's basketball tournament